La Cellera de Ter, also locally known simply as La Cellera,  is a village in the county of La Selva, province of Girona and autonomous community of Catalonia, Spain. More than half of the area is mountainous and is part of the eastern ridge of the Guilleries massif. The population density is 133,56 hab/km².

The village is 166 m above sea level. The highest mountain in the village is Sant Gregori (1088m) but the most representative one is Puigdefrou (843m).

Electronic music Sak Noel was born in the village in 1983.

References

External links
 Government data pages 

Municipalities in Selva